Soon Lee Bus Park is an SBS Transit West District bus depot located in Jurong West, Singapore. It is the only multi-storey bus depot owned by SBS Transit and the depot itself consists of 3 decks. This bus depot is also the starting point for Service 185 and Express 502. It replaced the former Jurong Bus Depot and Penjuru Bus Depot in 2002.

References

External links
 Interchanges and Terminals (SBS Transit)

Bus garages
Jurong West
Bus stations in Singapore